Matías Lionel Fritzler (born 23 August 1986) is an Argentine professional footballer who plays as a midfielder for Danubio.

Career

Fritzler is of German descent. He started his professional in 2004 with Lanús. He went on to establish himself as an important member of the first team and, in 2007, was part of the squad that won the 2007 Apertura tournament, Lanús' first ever top flight league title.

During the 2010–11 La Liga season, he played on loan for Hércules CF. Subsequently, he returned to Lanús for the 2011–12 Argentine Primera División season.

Honours
Lanús
Argentine Primera División (1): 2007 Apertura

External links
 Argentine Primera statistics at Fútbol XXI  
 

1986 births
Living people
People from Lomas de Zamora
Argentine footballers
Association football midfielders
Club Atlético Lanús footballers
Hércules CF players
Kasımpaşa S.K. footballers
Club Atlético Huracán footballers
Club Atlético Colón footballers
Danubio F.C. players
La Liga players
Argentine Primera División players
Uruguayan Primera División players
Süper Lig players
Argentine expatriate footballers
Expatriate footballers in Spain
Expatriate footballers in Turkey
Expatriate footballers in Uruguay
Argentine expatriate sportspeople in Spain
Argentine expatriate sportspeople in Turkey
Argentine expatriate sportspeople in Uruguay
Argentine people of German descent
Sportspeople from Buenos Aires Province